Taylor Alxndr is an Atlanta social activist, community organizer, entertainer, drag queen, and founder of the LGBTQ non-profit "Southern Fried Queer Pride".

Community work 
Alxndr has spoken out in support of "voices who have been marginalized and erased" and black queer and trans people in the South.

Alxndr also plans community events, including a "Paris Is Burning" ball in 2018.

Southern Fried Queer Pride 
Alxndr co-founded Southern Fried Queer Pride in 2014, which they say is a "a queer and trans, arts and community organization and festival based here in Atlanta, with roots all over the south.” Through their work with Southern Fried Queer Pride, Alxndr focuses their work on with black and brown trans youth.

In 2020, a GoFundMe for Southern Fried Queer Pride raised over $130,000 to create a community space for the organization,

Art 
Alxndr as a music artist has released songs and music videos including "Nightwork" (2017), their debut album "Hologram" in 2019, and "Say What You Mean" (2020); their music includes social justice messages about Black Lives Matter and the trans rights movement. Their music videos are inspired by 2000s culture and filmmakers like John Hughes.

Alxndr is a drag queen, and they are the house mother of "House of Alxndr". in 2019, Alxndr was voted 'Atlanta's Best Drag Queen & Best LGBTQ Performer'.

Personal life 
Alxndr uses they/them pronouns and identifies as non-binary. Alxndr was named one of one of the 100 most influential LGBTQ+ Georgians in 2020.

References

External links 
 
 
 

Living people
American LGBT musicians
American LGBT rights activists
Non-binary musicians
Non-binary drag performers
Non-binary activists
People from Georgia (U.S. state)
1993 births
LGBT people from Georgia (U.S. state)